Lohwagiella was a genus of fungi in the Ascomycota phylum.

The genus name of Lohwagiella is in honour of Kurt Lohwag (1913–1970), who was a Bohemian-born, Austrian botanist and mycologist.

The genus was circumscribed by Franz Petrak in Sydowia vol.23 (1-6) on page 280 in 1969.

Lohwagiella is now classed as a synonym of Niesslia

References

External links
Index Fungorum

Ascomycota genera